The Hanover-Taché Hockey League was a senior/intermediate ice hockey league that operated in southeastern Manitoba, Canada, from 1953 to 2005.

The league's name was derived from the two municipalities (Hanover and Taché) where several of its teams were located. Among the league's more notable clubs were the Île-des-Chênes North Stars (2003 Allan Cup champions) and Steinbach Huskies (1979 Allan Cup finalists).

Many of the league's former clubs now play in the Carillon Senior Hockey League, which was formed in 2003.

Teams

See also
Carillon Senior Hockey League
Hanover Tache Junior Hockey League

References

Defunct ice hockey leagues in Manitoba
Hockey Manitoba

Sport in Eastman Region, Manitoba